The 2014 Tour de Romandie was the 68th running of the Tour de Romandie cycling stage race. The race consisted of six stages, beginning with a prologue stage in Ascona on 29 April and concluding with another individual time trial, in Neuchâtel, on 4 May. It was the fourteenth race of the 2014 UCI World Tour season.

In exactly the same podium positions as the 2013 edition, Great Britain's Chris Froome of  won the race for a second successive year, after winning the final time trial stage in Neuchâtel. Having trailed  rider Simon Špilak by a single second going into the stage, Froome turned the deficit into a 28-second race-winning margin over the  stage. Špilak finished second, having won the race's third stage – the queen stage into Aigle – by beating Froome in a two-up sprint, after the pair had attacked towards the end of the stage. Costa finished 64 seconds behind Špilak, and one minute 32 seconds behind Froome.

In the race's other classifications, the 's Jesús Herrada was the winner of the white jersey for the young rider classification as he was the highest placed rider born in 1989 or later, finishing in ninth place overall, 16 seconds ahead of nearest rival, 's Thibaut Pinot.

Teams
As the Tour de Romandie was a UCI World Tour event, all 18 UCI ProTeams were invited automatically and obligated to send a squad. Only  were awarded a wildcard place into the race, thus completing the 19-team peloton. Pre-race favourites were Chris Froome, Tejay van Garderen, Michał Kwiatkowski, Simon Špilak, Vincenzo Nibali and Rui Costa.

The 19 teams that competed in the race were:

Schedule

Stages

Prologue
29 April 2014 — Ascona, individual time trial (ITT)

Prologue Result and General Classification after Prologue

Stage 1
30 April 2014 — Brigerbad to Sion, 

Stage 2
1 May 2014 — Sion to Montreux,

Stage 3
2 May 2014 — Le Bouveret to Aigle,

Stage 4
3 May 2014 — Fribourg to Fribourg,

Stage 5
4 May 2014 — Neuchâtel, individual time trial (ITT)

Classification leadership table
In the 2014 Tour de Romandie, four different jerseys were awarded. For the general classification, calculated by adding each cyclist's finishing times on each stage, and allowing time bonuses in mass-start stages – on a basis of ten seconds to the stage winner, six seconds for second place and four seconds for third place – the leader received a yellow jersey. This classification was considered the most important of the 2014 Tour de Romandie, and the winner of the classification was considered the winner of the race.

Additionally, there was a young rider classification, which awarded a white jersey. This was decided in the same way as the general classification, but only riders born after 1 January 1989 were eligible to be ranked in the classification. There was also a mountains classification, the leadership of which was marked by a pink jersey. In the mountains classification, points were won by reaching the top of a climb before other cyclists, with more points available for the higher-categorised climbs; there were fourteen categorised climbs in the race, split into three distinctive categories.

The fourth jersey represented the sprints classification, marked by a green jersey. In the sprints classification, cyclists received points for finishing in the top 3 at intermediate sprint points during each stage, with the exception of the individual time trial stages. There was also a classification for teams, in which the times of the best three cyclists per team on each stage were added together; the leading team at the end of the race was the team with the lowest total time.

Notes

References

External links

Tour de Romandie
Tour de Romandie
Tour de Romandie